Hawsh al-Sayyid Ali (also known as Hosh al-Sayyed Ali) is a village in central Syria, administratively part of the Homs Governorate, located southwest of Homs and immediately east of the border with Lebanon. Nearby localities include al-Masriyah to the northwest, al-Qusayr to the northeast, Rablah to the east, al-Nizariyah to the south. According to the Central Bureau of Statistics (CBS), Hawsh al-Sayyid Ali had a population of 541 in the 2004 census. Its inhabitants are predominantly Shia Muslims.

References

Populated places in al-Qusayr District
Shia Muslim communities in Syria